Delisa Newton (1934–2004) was an American nurse and jazz vocalist  in the American press, most notably in a 1966 issue of Sepia.

Born in New Orleans, her mother was of Haitian descent, and her Baptist minister father left when she was three. In a series of tabloid articles in the mid-1960s, Newton described her transition and life, as well as her personal views.

Newton died from stomach cancer in 2004. At the time of her death, she resided in Douglasville, Georgia. Newton was cremated at the request of family and her ashes were transported to Houma, Louisiana.

References

1934 births
2004 deaths
Transgender singers
American LGBT singers
LGBT people from Louisiana
American jazz singers
Jazz musicians from New Orleans
Singers from Louisiana
LGBT African Americans
Transgender women
21st-century LGBT people
20th-century African-American women singers